Polistes crinitus multicolor is a subspecies of Polistes crinitus that lives on small Caribbean islands.

References

Insects of the Caribbean
crinitus multicolor